Diego Fortuny (born 27 September 1991) is an Argentine rugby union player who plays for the Houston SaberCats in Major League Rugby (MLR). He also plays for the Jaguares in Super Rugby.

On 2 January 2018, Diego was named in the Jaguares squad for the 2018 Super Rugby season.

References

External links
 itsrugby Profile

Jaguares (Super Rugby) players
Houston SaberCats players
Rugby union hookers
Argentine rugby union players
1991 births
Living people
Argentina international rugby union players
American Raptors players